Alfredo Roberts (born March 17, 1965) is an American football coach and former tight end in the National Football League (NFL), who serves as the tight ends coach for the Pittsburgh Steelers. He played for the Kansas City Chiefs and Dallas Cowboys. He played college football at the University of Miami.

Early years
Roberts attended South Plantation High School. As a senior tight end, he received All-city and second-team All-state honors. He helped his team win 2 consecutive city championships.

In baseball, he was a second-team All-state catcher/first baseman as a senior. He led his team in hitting in two of his three seasons.

College career
Roberts accepted a football scholarship from the University of Miami. In 1983, he was redshirted, when head coach Howard Schnellenberger led the team to a National Championship.

As a freshman, he was a backup tight end behind Willie Smith. The next year, he was a third-string tight end, after being passed on the depth chart by Charles Henry.

As a junior, he was used as a backup blocking tight end behind Henry, increasing his receiving production to 10 receptions for 105 yards and 2 touchdowns.

As a senior in 1987, he shared the starting position with Henry, making 13 receptions for 137 yards and one touchdown, as part of a 12-0 undefeated team, that won the National Championship under head coach Jimmy Johnson.

He finished his career with 29 receptions for 296 yards and 4 touchdowns, while playing on 3 bowl teams (two Fiesta Bowls, one Sugar Bowl and one Orange Bowl).

Professional career

Kansas City Chiefs
Roberts was selected by the Kansas City Chiefs in the eighth-round (197th overall) of the 1988 NFL Draft. As a rookie, he started the first 7 games, before being limited with a shoulder injury that required arthroscopic surgery in the offseason. He was replaced in the starting lineupe with Jonathan Hayes.

In 1989, he was a backup behind Hayes, making 8 receptions for 55 yards and one touchdown. In 1990, he started 13 games, posting 11 receptions for 119 yards

Dallas Cowboys
On March 18, 1991, he was signed in Plan B free agency by the Dallas Cowboys, reuniting with his former University of Miami head coach Jimmy Johnson. He was used as a blocking tight end behind Jay Novacek, helping Emmit Smith lead the league with 365 carries for 1,563 rushing yards.

In 1992, he contributed to Smith leading the league with 1,713 rushing yards and 18 rushing touchdowns. He missed the playoffs because of a right knee injury he suffered in the season finale against the Chicago Bears and was not a part of Super Bowl XXVII. He was replaced with Derek Tennell.

In 1993, he was placed on the injured reserve list after fracturing his foot during a training camp passing drill against the Los Angeles Raiders. He was eventually replaced with Scott Galbraith. On March 31, 1994, he was released after not being able to recover from his previous foot injury.

References

External links
 Los Angeles Chargers profiles

1965 births
Living people
People from Plantation, Florida
Sportspeople from Broward County, Florida
African-American players of American football
Players of American football from Florida
American football tight ends
American football wide receivers
South Plantation High School alumni
Miami Hurricanes football players
Kansas City Chiefs players
Dallas Cowboys players
African-American coaches of American football
Coaches of American football from Florida
Florida Atlantic Owls football coaches
Jacksonville Jaguars coaches
Cleveland Browns coaches
Tampa Bay Buccaneers coaches
Indianapolis Colts coaches
High school football coaches in Indiana
Los Angeles Chargers coaches
Pittsburgh Steelers coaches
21st-century African-American people
20th-century African-American sportspeople